The Customs and Excise Department (C&ED) is a government agency responsible for the protection of the Hong Kong Special Administrative Region against smuggling; the protection and collection of revenue on dutiable goods on behalf of the Hong Kong Government; the detection and deterrence of drug trafficking and abuse of controlled drugs; the protection of intellectual property rights; the protection of consumer interests; and the protection and facilitation of legitimate trade and upholding Hong Kong's trading integrity .

History 

Hong Kong Customs, originally known as the Preventive Service, was founded in 1909. Initially it was responsible to collect the newly imposed duties on liquor. As commodities became subject to duties, the scope of the Preventive Service broadened to include tobacco and hydrocarbon oil, as well as duties related to the government opium monopoly. During times of war, the service prevented the export of precious metals and other commodities to the enemies of the United Kingdom and its allies. In 1963, with the passage of the Preventive Service Ordinance, the service gained the legal status to make regulations on its discipline, functions, powers and terms of service. In 1977, it was renamed the Hong Kong Customs and Excise Service. On 1 August 1982, The Hong Kong Customs and Excise Department became independent from the Trade and Industry Department.

The C&ED is an active member of the World Customs Organization (WCO) and the Asia Pacific Economic Cooperation (APEC). It exchanges intelligence and works closely with overseas Customs administrations and law enforcement agencies.

In the early 2000s, the Computer Forensic Laboratory, the Computer Analysis and Response Team, and the Anti-Internet Piracy Investigation Team were established to tackle cybercrime. In 2013, the Electronic Crime Investigation Centre was set up within the department.

Departmental structure and organisation 
The department is headed by the Commissioner of Customs and Excise. From 21 October 2021, this position is held by Louise Ho Pui-shan, its first female occupant and wife of Erick Tsang, Hong Kong's Secretary for Constitutional and Mainland Affairs.

As at 1 April 2020, the department has an establishment of 7,317 posts, of which nine are directorate officers, 6,142 are members of the Customs and Excise Service, 493 are Trade Controls Officers and 673 are staff of the General and Common Grades.

There are five branches:

Administration and Human Resource Development Branch 
The Administration and Human Resource Development Branch is responsible for matters concerning the overall staff management of the Customs and Excise Service; departmental administration; financial management; staff training; and the housekeeping of the Office of Service Administration, the Office of Departmental Administration, the Office of Financial Administration, the Office of Prosecution and Management Support, the Office of Training and Development and the Complaints Investigation Group.

Boundary and Ports Branch 
The Boundary and Ports Branch is responsible for matters relating to import and export controls under the purview of the Security Bureau and the housekeeping of the Airport Command, the Cross-boundary Bridge Command, the Land Boundary Command, the Rail and Ferry Command, and the Ports and Maritime Command.

Excise and Strategic Support Branch 
The Excise and Strategic Support Branch is responsible for matters relating to dutiable commodities under the purview of the Financial Services and the Treasury Bureau; taking forward the Hong Kong Authorized Economic Operator Programme and implementation of Mutual Recognition Arrangements with partner customs administrations; international customs liaison and cooperation; project planning and equipment procurement; information technology development; operation of the Trade Single Window and the housekeeping of the Office of Dutiable Commodities Administration, the Office of Supply Chain Security Management, the Office of Customs Affairs and Co-operation, the Office of Project Planning and Development, the Office of Information Technology, the Office of Trade Single Window Operation and the Information Unit.

Intelligence and Investigation Branch 
The Intelligence and Investigation Branch  is responsible for matters relating to narcotic drugs and anti- smuggling enforcement under the schedule of the Security Bureau and issues relating to intellectual property under the purview of the Commerce and Economic Development Bureau; the formulation of policies and strategies regarding the application of intelligence and risk management in Customs operations; and the housekeeping of the Customs Drug Investigation Bureau, the Intellectual Property Investigation Bureau, the Intelligence Bureau, the Revenue Crimes Investigation Bureau and the Syndicate Crimes Investigation Bureau.

Trade Controls Branch 
The Trade Controls Branch is responsible for trade controls and consumer protection matters under the schedule of the Commerce and Economic Development Bureau and supervision of MSOs under the schedule of the Financial Services and the Treasury Bureau. It comprises the CEPA and Trade Inspection Bureau, the Consumer Protection Bureau, the Trade Descriptions Investigation Bureau, the Trade Declaration and Systems Bureau, the Trade Investigation Bureau and the Money Service Supervision Bureau.

Office of Quality Management and Internal Audit Division 
Under the direct charge of the Deputy Commissioner are the Office of Quality Management and the Internal Audit Division. The Office of Quality Management and the Internal Audit Division are responsible for conducting management reviews and money-related examinations respectively, with a view to enhancing the system integrity, efficiency and effectiveness, service quality and performance standard of the department.

Ranks
As with all of the HK Disciplined Services, British-pattern ranks and insignia continue to be utilised, the only change being the exchange of the St. Edward's Crown for the Bauhinia flower crest post-1997.

Customs and Excise Service
 Commissioner Grade
 Commissioner (similar insignia to a UK General)
 Deputy Commissioner (similar insignia to a UK Lieutenant-General)
 Assistant Commissioner (similar insignia to a UK Major-General)
 Superintendent Grade
 Chief Superintendent (similar insignia to a UK Colonel)
 Senior Superintendent (similar insignia to a UK Lieutenant-Colonel)
 Superintendent (similar insignia to a UK Major)
 Assistant Superintendent (similar insignia to a UK Captain)
 Inspectorate Grade
 Senior Inspector (similar insignia to a UK Lieutenant with a bar beneath)
 Inspector (similar insignia to a UK Lieutenant)
 Probationary Inspector (similar insignia to a UK Second Lieutenant)
 Customs Officer Grade
 Chief Customs Officer (Wreathed fouled anchor)
 Senior Customs Officer (Three chevrons)
 Customs Officer (ID number)

Trade Controls Officer Grade
 Head Of Trade Controls / Senior Principal Trade Controls Officer
 Principal Trade Controls Officer
 Chief Trade Controls Officer
 Senior Trade Controls Officer
 Trade Controls Officer
 Assistant Trade Controls Officer

Crest 
The current crest of the force was adopted in 1997 to replace most of the colonial symbols:
 St Edward's Crown replaced with Bauhinia
 Laurel wreath is added to replace the colonial Brunswick star
 Motto changed from "Customs Hong Kong to Hong Kong Customs and Excise 香港海關
 Badge theme added with key and sword to replace the words "香港海關"

Source: Customs and Excise Department [Hong Kong]

Protection of revenue
There are no tariffs on goods entering Hong Kong, but excise duties are charged on four groups of commodities: hydrocarbon oil, liquor, methyl alcohol and tobacco. The duties apply equally to imported commodities and those manufactured locally for domestic consumption.

In 2003, the C&ED collected $6,484 million excise duty. Under the Dutiable Commodities Ordinance, the C&ED controls breweries, distilleries, tobacco factories, oil installations, ship and aircraft duty-free stores, and industrial and commercial establishments dealing with dutiable commodities; and supervises licensed, general bonded and public bonded warehouses.

Licences are issued to those who import, export, manufacture or store dutiable commodities. The C&ED also assesses the First Registration Tax of vehicles under the Motor Vehicle (First Registration Tax) Ordinance. The Anti-illicit Cigarette Investigation Division is specially tasked to detect syndicated smuggling, distribution and peddling of dutiable cigarettes. The Diesel Oil Enforcement Division focuses its efforts on detecting the smuggling and misuse of illicit fuels.

Prevention and detection of smuggling
The C&ED prevents and detects smuggling activities under the Import and Export Ordinance and enforces the licensing controls on prohibited articles by inspecting cargoes imported and exported by air, sea and land; processing passengers and their baggage at entry /exit points; and searching aircraft, vessels and vehicles entering and leaving Hong Kong. The Joint Police/Customs Anti-Smuggling Task Force is dedicated to combating smuggling activities by sea. The Control Points Investigation Division is tasked to strengthen the intelligence collection capability at the land boundary and suppress the cross-boundary smuggling activities.

The smuggling of frozen meat to mainland China, using barges and powerful speedboats off the west coast of Hong Kong, remains a serious problem, with an estimated 600 tonnes being transshipped every day. Despite frequent operations, the department is able to intercept only a fraction - a total of 1,050 tonnes in 2019.

Border control points
Man Kam To – customs point handling autos and lorries; 4-lane bridge across Shenzhen River
Sha Tau Kok – customs point handling autos and lorries
Lok Ma Chau – large customs point handling auto and lorries; multi-lane bridge across Shenzhen
Lo Wu – located at the Lo Wu MTR station
Hong Kong China Ferry Terminal, Tsim Sha Tsui
Hong Kong–Macau Ferry Terminal
Hong Kong International Airport
Hong Kong West Kowloon Station
Hong Kong–Zhuhai–Macau Bridge

Trade controls and consumer protection
The C&ED safeguards the certification and licensing systems which are of vital importance to Hong Kong's trading integrity. The department deters and investigates offences of origin fraud, circumvention of textiles licensing and quota control. It also investigates offences of import and export of strateg commodities and other prohibited articles not under and in accordance with a licence.

The department carries out cargo examination at control points, factory inspections, factory audit checks and consignment checks. It is also the department's enforcement strategy to administer a monetary reward scheme to encourage the supply of information on textile origin fraud.

The department is a member of the Hong Kong Compliance Office set up to assist the Central People's Government in implementing the Chemical Weapons Convention in Hong Kong. The department enforces licensing control on rice and consumer protection legislation relating to weights and measures, markings on fineness of precious metals, and safety of toys, children's products and consumer goods. The department also verifies import and export declarations to ensure accurate trade statistics and assesses and collects declaration charges and the clothing industry training levy.

In 2002/03, the department collected $848 million in declaration charges and $19.9 million in clothing industry training levies.

Intellectual property rights protection
The C&ED has the mission to defend the interests of intellectual property rights owners and legitimate traders through staunch enforcement of the Copyright Ordinance, the Trade Descriptions Ordinance and the Prevention of Copyright Piracy Ordinance.

The department investigates and prosecutes copyright offences relating to literary, dramatic, musical and artistic works, sound recordings, cinematographic films, broadcasts and other published works under the Copyright Ordinance. It also takes enforcement action against commercial goods with forged trademark or false label under the Trade Descriptions Ordinance.

At the manufacture level, the Prevention of Copyright Piracy Ordinance requires local optical disc and stamper manufacturers to obtain licences from the department and mark on all their products specific identification codes. The Import and Export Ordinance imposes licensing controls on the import and export of optical disc mastering and replication equipment. A 147-strong Special Task Force has also been playing an important role in combating copyright piracy, and serves as a mobile brigade to reinforce the suppression of other customs-related crimes.

Customs co-operation
The C&ED is an active member of the World Customs Organization (WCO) and Asia Pacific Economic Cooperation (APEC). It exchanges intelligence and works closely with overseas customs administrations and law enforcement agencies. The department has also entered bilateral Cooperative Arrangements with other customs authorities on administrative assistance. At the working level, the department and the Mainland customs have each established designated liaison officers to facilitate the exchange of intelligence through direct telephone hotlines.

See also 

 Hong Kong Police Force
 Marine Region
 Border patrol
 Border control

References

Further reading 
  - Permalink to PDF

External links 

 Hong Kong Customs and Excise (official website)

Order of precedence 

Customs services
Law enforcement agencies of Hong Kong
Hong Kong government departments and agencies
Government agencies established in 1909
1909 establishments in Hong Kong